Frederick Francis Jeremy Johnson (born 26 March 1990) is an English former first-class cricketer. Johnson was educated at Westminster School and the University of Oxford.  He played one first-class match for Oxford University in 2012.

See also
 List of Oxford University Cricket Club players

References

External links
 
 

1990 births
Living people
English cricketers
Oxford University cricketers
Cricketers from Greater London
People educated at Westminster School, London